Reginald Gresham Kirkby (1916–2006) was an English Anglican priest and anarchist socialist.

Kirkby was born in Cornwall on 11 August 1916. His mother and aunt were Methodist, but he was inclined towards Anglo-Catholicism from an early age. Kirby graduated from the University of Leeds and studied at the College of the Resurrection, Mirfield, West Yorkshire, where he became friends with Trevor Huddleston, in the 1940s. He was ordained in Manchester as a deacon in 1942 and as a priest in 1943 and served as vicar of St Paul's, Bow Common, London, from July 1951 to July 1994.

Kirby was an anarchist socialist (or anarcho-communist), an early supporter of the Campaign for Nuclear Disarmament, and a member of the Committee of 100. He was influenced by Peter Kropotkin and Dorothy Day, co-founder of the Catholic Worker Movement.

Kirkby died on 10 August 2006.

Works
 "Kingdom Come: The Catholic Faith and Millennial Hopes". In Leech, Kenneth; Williams, Rowan. Essays Catholic and Radical. London: Bowerdean Press. 1983. Accessed 10 January 2019.

See also
 Christian communism
 Christian socialism

References

Bibliography

Further reading

 

1916 births
2006 deaths
20th-century English Anglican priests
Alumni of the College of the Resurrection
Alumni of the University of Leeds
Anarcho-communists
Anglican pacifists
Anglo-Catholic clergy
Anglo-Catholic socialists
Christian anarchists
Christian communists
Church of England priests
English Anglo-Catholics
English anti–nuclear weapons activists
English Christian pacifists
English Christian socialists
English communists
English anarchists